KDIS-FM (99.5 FM, "FaithTalk 99.5") is a radio station licensed to Little Rock, Arkansas, United States. The station is owned by the Salem Media Group, through licensee Salem Communications Holding Corporation.

History
The station went on the air as KLVV on July 26, 1991. On February 1, 1992, the station changed its call sign to KYFX. On August 7, 2003, the station switched calls to the current KDIS-FM.

In June 2013, Disney put KDIS-FM and six other Radio Disney stations in medium markets up for sale, in order to refocus the network's broadcast distribution on top-25 markets. On July 31, 2013, KDIS-FM dropped the Radio Disney affiliation and went silent; in October, Disney filed to sell KDIS-FM, as well as KRDY in San Antonio, Texas, to Salem Communications Corporation. The purchase by Salem, at a price of $2 million, was consummated on February 7, 2014.

On February 24, 2014, KDIS-FM returned to the air with Christian talk, branded as "Faith Talk 99.5."

References

External links

Mass media in Little Rock, Arkansas
Salem Media Group properties
Former subsidiaries of The Walt Disney Company
DIS-FM